Karvaneh-ye Vosta (also Romanized as Kārvāneh-ye Vosţá) is a village in Sar Firuzabad Rural District, Firuzabad District, Kermanshah County, Kermanshah Province, Iran. At the 2006 census, its population was 74, in 18 families.

References 

Populated places in Kermanshah County